RABad (ראב״ד, pronounced also Raavad, Ravad or Raivid) is a Hebrew acronym which most commonly refers to Rabbi Abraham Ben David, or the RABaD III. There are three rabbis and scholars referred to by this acronym:

People
 Rabbi Abraham ibn Daud, the first RABaD, a Spanish-Jewish philosopher and historian
 Rabbi Abraham ben Isaac of Narbonne the Eshkol, called RABad II, being an acronym for Rav Av Beth Din
 Rabbi Abraham ben David of Posquières, called RABaD III, a son-in-law of the former

Other uses 
 RABaD or Ravad, the head of any Rabbinical court, being an acronym for Rosh Beth Din
 Rábade or "San Vicenzo de Rábade", a town in the northwest of Spain in the province of Lugo

See also
Rabad

Informal personal names